Puntang can refer to one of the following:

 Long-finned goby, a fish
 slang term for vagina.
 Mount Puntang, a mountain south of Bandung, Indonesia